Vidya Beniwal is an Indian politician. She was a Member of Parliament, representing Haryana in the Rajya Sabha the upper house of India's Parliament as a member of the Janata Dal.

References

Rajya Sabha members from Haryana
Janata Dal politicians
Indian National Lok Dal politicians
1944 births
Living people
Women members of the Rajya Sabha
Samata Party politicians